Boronia jensziae, commonly known as Andy Jensz's boronia or Hinchinbrook boronia, is a plant in the citrus family Rutaceae and is endemic to Hinchinbrook Island in Queensland. It is an erect, densely branched shrub with simple leaves and pink to white, four-petalled flowers usually arranged singly in leaf axils.

Description
The eight stamens are hairy with those opposite the sepals longer than those near the petals.

Taxonomy and naming
Boronia jensziae was first formally described in 1999 by Marco F. Duretto who published the description in the journal  Austrobaileya. The specific epithet (jensziae) honours Andrea Susan Jensz for her assistance to the authors.

Distribution and habitat
Andy Jensz's boronia grows in a variety of habitats including open forest and heath on the summit of Mount Bowman. It is only known from Hinchinbrook Island.

Conservation
Boronia jensziae is listed as "least concern" under the Queensland Government Nature Conservation Act 1992.

References 

jensziae
Flora of Queensland
Plants described in 1999
Taxa named by Marco Duretto